Rocky Hill is a West Knoxville neighborhood in Knoxville, Tennessee. It encompasses an area north and west of Tennessee State Route 332 (Northshore Drive), east of Wallace Road, and south of Westland Drive.

Its ZIP code is 37919.

References

City-data.com Profile of the Rocky Hill neighborhood in Knoxville, TN.
Knoxville.com Profile of the Rocky Hill neighborhood in Knoxville, TN.

Neighborhoods in Knoxville, Tennessee